Michael Davidson (born 1963 as Michael Jay Davidson in New Jersey) is a singer and songwriter.

Career 
American-born Michael Davidson was signed to Sire Records on the recommendation of Andy Warhol, after the pair became acquainted during a mutual visit to France. Davidson won the record deal after presenting a number of songs he'd cowritten, including his most well known track, "Turn It Up".

"Turn it up" was produced by Stock Aitken Waterman and Phil Harding and became a dance hit in 1987. The song was featured in the Madonna movie Who's That Girl. Unlike the movie, the soundtrack to Who's That Girl became a big international success spending many weeks in the Top Ten Album Chart in the United States, Europe and Asia. Released on July 21, 1987 the album sold almost 5 million copies worldwide, of which 1 million in the US (Platinum). The Washington Post described the song as "gratingly banal" and its singer as "one of Madonna's photogenic protegés"

A second single, "Warehouse", was released in 1989, but Davidson was dropped by Warners during a period of cost cutting at the label, and his album was never released. He went on to a career in fine art photography.

Discography 
 Michael Davidson: 'Turn it up', 1987, 12-inch single. Sire Records.
Warner Music: 0-20671. Track list: 
 Turn It Up (In Full Cry mix)
 Turn It Up (instrumental)
 Turn It Up (dub mix)
 Turn It Up (7" remix)
 Michael Davidson: 'Warehouse', 1989, 12-inch single. Sire Records.
Warner Music: 21288. Track list: 
 Warehouse (real club mix)
 Warehouse (radio mix)
 Warehouse (groove mix)
 Warehouse (instrumental mix)

References

External links 
 Michael Davidson Official VEVO/YouTube Site
 Michael Davidson Official Facebook Site
 Michael Davidson Fine Art Site

1963 births
Living people
Musicians from New Jersey